Koke'e is a headland on the northwest coast of the island of Kauai in the Hawaiian Islands.

References 

Headlands of Kauai